Ulrica Persson, born 7 March 1975, is a Swedish cross-country skier. She won the women's main competition of Vasaloppet in 2001 and 2003. In 2003, she also won Tjejvasan. She also competed in the women's 30 kilometre classical at the 2002 Winter Olympics.

Cross-country skiing results
All results are sourced from the International Ski Federation (FIS).

Olympic Games

World Cup

Season standings

References

External links

1975 births
Living people
Swedish female cross-country skiers
Vasaloppet winners
Olympic cross-country skiers of Sweden
Cross-country skiers at the 2002 Winter Olympics
People from Torsby Municipality
21st-century Swedish women